The 2016–17 Indian Federation Cup was the 38th edition of the Federation Cup, the main domestic football cup competition in India. The top eight teams from the 2016–17 I-League season will participate in the tournament which will be hosted solely in Cuttack, Odisha. The tournament is set to take place between 7 May to 21 May 2017. Mohun Bagan are the defending champions.

Unlike the previous season of the tournament which was held on a home–away basis, this edition will revert to the previous format in which one venue hosts the entire tournament.

Round and dates

Teams 
The following teams qualified for the Federation Cup through ending in the top eight during the 2016–17 I-League:

 Aizawl
 Bengaluru FC
 Chennai City
 Churchill Brothers
 DSK Shivajians
 East Bengal
 Mohun Bagan
 Shillong Lajong

Group stage

Bracket

Semi-finals

Final

Goal scorers

3 goals:

  Darryl Duffy (Mohun Bagan)
  Laldanmawia Ralte (Aizawl)
  Balwant Singh (Mohun Bagan)

2 goals:

  Yuta Kinowaki (Shillong Lajong)
  Ansumana Kromah (Churchill Brothers)
  Samuel Lalmuanpuia (Shillong Lajong)
  Holicharan Narzary (DSK Shivajians)
  Sony Norde (Mohun Bagan)
  Juan Quero (DSK Shivajians)
  Robin Singh (East Bengal)
  Charles de Souza (Chennai City)
  Edwin Vanspaul (Chennai City)
  C.K. Vineeth (Bengaluru FC)

1 goal:

  Mahmoud Amnah (Aizawl)
  Wedson Anselme (East Bengal)
  Alen Deory (Shillong Lajong)
  Brandon Fernandes (Churchill Brothers)
  Dhanpal Ganesh (Chennai City)
  Alwyn George (Bengaluru FC)
  Jeje Lalpekhlua (Mohun Bagan)
  Lalramchullova (Aizawl) 
  Eugeneson Lyngdoh (Bengaluru FC)
  Udanta Singh (Bengaluru FC)
  Redeem Tlang (Shillong Lajong)
  Cameron Watson (Bengaluru)
  Katsumi Yusa (Mohun Bagan)

Own goals:
  Aiborlang Khongjee (Shillong Lajong) (playing against Bengaluru FC)

Hero of the Match

References

External links
 Official AIFF website

 
2016-17
Federation Cup
India